Jim Garner was an American football player and coach. Garner played guard at Livingston State College (now the University of West Alabama) from 1949 to 1951. He later served as the head football coach at Livingston State from 1960 through his resignation from the school following the 1966 season. During his tenure there, he compiled an overall record of 22 wins, 39 losses  and 3 ties (22–39–3).

Head coaching record

References

Year of birth missing
Year of death missing
West Alabama Tigers football coaches
West Alabama Tigers football players